Cappelle-la-Grande is a commune in the Nord department in northern France.

It is very close to Dunkirk.

Population

Heraldry

See also
Communes of the Nord department
Cappelle-la-Grande Open

References

Cappellelagrande
French Flanders